Db2 is a family of data management products, including database servers, developed by IBM. It initially supported the relational model, but was extended to support object–relational features and non-relational structures like JSON and XML. The brand name was originally styled as DB/2, then DB2 until 2017 and finally changed to its present form.

History
Unlike other database vendors, IBM previously produced a platform-specific Db2 product for each of its major operating systems. However, in the 1990s IBM changed track and produced a Db2 common product, designed with a mostly common code base for L-U-W (Linux-Unix-Windows); DB2 for System z and DB2 for IBM i are different. As a result, they use different drivers.

DB2 traces its roots back to the beginning of the 1970s when Edgar F. Codd, a researcher working for IBM, described the theory of relational databases, and in June 1970 published the model for data manipulation.

In 1974, the IBM San Jose Research center developed a relational DBMS, System R, to implement Codd's concepts. A key development of the System R project was the Structured Query Language (SQL). To apply the relational model, Codd needed a relational-database language he named DSL/Alpha. At the time, IBM didn't believe in the potential of Codd's ideas, leaving the implementation to a group of programmers not under Codd's supervision. This led to an inexact interpretation of Codd's relational model that matched only part of the prescriptions of the theory; the result was Structured English QUEry Language or SEQUEL.

When IBM released its first relational-database product, they wanted to have a commercial-quality sublanguage as well, so it overhauled SEQUEL and renamed the revised language Structured Query Language (SQL) to differentiate it from SEQUEL, and also because the acronym "SEQUEL" was a trademark of the UK-based Hawker Siddeley aircraft company.

IBM bought Metaphor Computer Systems to utilize their GUI interface and encapsulating SQL platform that had already been in use since the mid-80s.

In parallel with the development of SQL, IBM also developed Query by Example (QBE), the first graphical query language.

IBM's first commercial relational-database product, SQL/DS, was released for the DOS/VSE and VM/CMS operating systems in 1981. In 1976, IBM released Query by Example for the VM platform where the table-oriented front-end produced a linear-syntax language that drove transactions to its relational database.  Later, the QMF feature of DB2 produced real SQL, and brought the same "QBE" look and feel to DB2. The inspiration for the mainframe version of DB2's architecture came in part from IBM IMS, a hierarchical database, and its dedicated database-manipulation language, IBM DL/I.

The name DB2 (IBM Database 2), was first given to the Database Management System or DBMS in 1983 when IBM released DB2 on its MVS mainframe platform.

For some years DB2, as a full-function DBMS, was exclusively available on IBM mainframes. Later, IBM brought DB2 to other platforms, including OS/2, UNIX, and MS Windows servers, and then Linux (including Linux on IBM Z) and PDAs. This process occurred through the 1990s. An implementation of DB2 is also available for z/VSE and z/VM. An earlier version of the code that would become DB2 LUW (Linux, Unix, Windows) was part of an Extended Edition component of OS/2 called Database Manager.

IBM extended the functionality of Database Manager a number of times, including the addition of distributed database functionality by means of Distributed Relational Database Architecture (DRDA) that allowed shared access to a database in a remote location on a LAN. (Note that DRDA is based on objects and protocols defined by Distributed Data Management Architecture (DDM).)

Eventually, IBM decided to rewrite the software completely. The new version of Database Manager was called DB2/2 and DB2/6000 respectively. Other versions of DB2, with different code bases, followed the same '/' naming convention and became DB2/400 (for the AS/400), DB2/VSE (for the DOS/VSE environment), and DB2/VM (for the VM operating system). IBM lawyers stopped this handy naming convention from being used, and decided that all products needed to be called "product FOR platform" (for example, DB2 for OS/390). The next iteration of the mainframe and the server-based products were named DB2 Universal Database (or DB2 UDB).

In the mid-1990s, IBM released a clustered DB2 implementation called DB2 Parallel Edition, which initially ran on AIX. This edition allowed scalability by providing a shared-nothing architecture, in which a single large database is partitioned across multiple DB2 servers that communicate over a high-speed interconnect. This DB2 edition was eventually ported to all Linux, UNIX, and Windows (LUW) platforms, and was renamed to DB2 Extended Enterprise Edition (EEE). IBM now refers to this product as the Database Partitioning Feature (DPF) and bundles it with their flagship DB2 Enterprise product.

When Informix Corporation acquired Illustra and made their database engine an object-SQL DBMS by introducing their Universal Server, both Oracle Corporation and IBM followed suit by changing their database engines to be capable of object–relational extensions. In 2001, IBM bought Informix Software, and in the following years incorporated Informix technology into the DB2 product suite. DB2 can technically be considered to be an object–SQL DBMS.

In mid-2006, IBM announced "Viper", the codename for DB2 9 on both distributed platforms and z/OS. DB2 9 for z/OS was announced in early 2007. IBM claimed that the new DB2 was the first relational database to store XML "natively". Other enhancements include OLTP-related improvements for distributed platforms, business intelligence/data warehousing-related improvements for z/OS, more self-tuning and self-managing features, additional 64-bit exploitation (especially for virtual storage on z/OS), stored procedure performance enhancements for z/OS, and continued convergence of the SQL vocabularies between z/OS and distributed platforms.

In October 2007, IBM announced "Viper 2", the codename for DB2 9.5 on the distributed platforms. There were three key themes for the release, Simplified Management, Business Critical Reliability, and Agile XML development.

In June 2009, IBM announced "Cobra", the codename for DB2 9.7 for LUW. DB2 9.7 added data compression for database indexes, temporary tables, and large objects. DB2 9.7 also supported native XML data in hash partitioning (database partitioning), range partitioning (table partitioning), and multi-dimensional clustering. These native XML features allows users to directly work with XML in data warehouse environments. DB2 9.7 also added several features that make it easier for Oracle Database users to work with DB2. These include support for the most commonly used SQL syntax, PL/SQL syntax, scripting syntax, and data types from Oracle Database. DB2 9.7 also enhanced its concurrency model to exhibit behavior that is familiar to users of Oracle Database and Microsoft SQL Server.

In October 2009, IBM introduced its second major release of the year when it announced DB2 pureScale. DB2 pureScale is a cluster database for non-mainframe platforms, suitable for Online transaction processing (OLTP) workloads. IBM based the design of DB2 pureScale on the Parallel Sysplex implementation of DB2 data sharing on the mainframe. DB2 pureScale provides a fault-tolerant architecture and shared-disk storage. A DB2 pureScale system can grow to 128 database servers, and provides continuous availability and automatic load balancing.

In 2009, it was announced that DB2 can be an engine in MySQL. This allows users on the IBM i platform and users on other platforms to access these files through the MySQL interface. On IBM i and its predecessor OS/400, DB2 is tightly integrated into the operating system, and comes as part of the operating system. It provides journaling, triggers and other features.

In early 2012, IBM announced the next version of DB2, DB2 10.1 (code name Galileo) for Linux, UNIX, and Windows. DB2 10.1 contained a number of new data management capabilities including row and column access control which enables 'fine-grained' control of the database and multi-temperature data management that moves data to cost effective storage based on how "hot" or "cold" (how frequently the data is accessed) the data is. IBM also introduced "adaptive compression" capability in DB2 10.1, a new approach to compressing data tables.

In June 2013, IBM released DB2 10.5 (code name "Kepler").

On 12 April 2016, IBM announced DB2 LUW 11.1, and in June 2016, it was released.

In mid-2017, IBM re-branded its DB2 and dashDB product offerings and amended their names to "Db2".

On June 27, 2019, IBM released Db2 11.5, the AI Database.  It added AI functionality to improve query performance as well as capabilities to facilitate AI application development.

On May 31, 2022, IBM released Db2 13 for z/OS.

Db2 Database
Db2 (Formerly Db2 for LUW) is a relational database that delivers advanced data management and analytics capabilities for transactional workloads. This operational database is designed to deliver high performance, actionable insights, data availability and reliability, and it is supported across Linux, Unix and Windows operating systems.

The Db2 database software includes advanced features such as in-memory technology (IBM BLU Acceleration), advanced management and development tools, storage optimization, workload management, actionable compression and continuous data availability (IBM pureScale).

Db2 Warehouse
"Data warehousing" was first mentioned in a 1988 IBM Systems Journal article entitled, "An Architecture for Business Information Systems." This article illustrated the first use-case for data warehousing in a business setting as well as the results of its application.

Traditional transaction processing databases were not able to provide the insight business leaders needed to make data-informed decisions. A new approach was needed to aggregate and analyze data from multiple transactional sources to deliver new insights, uncover patterns and find hidden relationships among the data. Db2 Warehouse, with capabilities to normalize data from multiple sources, performs sophisticated analytic and statistical modeling, provides businesses these features at speed and scale.

Increases in computational power resulted in an explosion of data inside businesses generally and data warehouses specifically. Warehouses grew from being measured in GBs to TBs and PBs. As both the volume and variety of data grew, Db2 Warehouse adapted as well. Initially purposed for star and snowflake schemas, Db2 Warehouse now includes support for the following data types and analytical models, among others:

 Relational data
 Non-Relational data
 XML data
 Geospatial data
 RStudio
 Apache Spark
 Embedded Spark Analytics engine
 Multi-Parallel Processing
 In-memory analytical processing
 Predictive Modeling algorithms

Db2 Warehouse uses Docker containers to run in multiple environments: on-premise, private cloud and a variety of public clouds, both managed and unmanaged. Db2 Warehouse can be deployed as software only, as an appliance and in Intel x86, Linux and mainframe platforms. Built upon IBM's Common SQL engine, Db2 Warehouse queries data from multiple sources—Oracle, Microsoft SQL Server, Teradata, open source, Netezza and others. Users write a query once and data returns from multiple sources quickly and efficiently.

Db2 on Cloud/Db2 Hosted
Db2 on Cloud: Formerly named "dashDB for Transactions", Db2 on Cloud is a fully managed, cloud SQL database with a high-availability option featuring a 99.99 percent uptime SLA. Db2 on Cloud offers independent scaling of storage and compute, and rolling security updates.

Db2 on Cloud is deployable on both IBM Cloud and Amazon Web Services (AWS).

Key features include:

 Elasticity: Db2 on Cloud offers independent scaling of storage and compute through the user interface and API, so businesses can burst on compute during peak demand and scale down when demand falls. Storage is also scalable, so organizations can scale up as their storage needs grow.
 Backups and Recovery: Db2 on Cloud provides several disaster recovery options: (1) Fourteen days' worth of back-ups, (2) point in time restore options, (3) 1-click failover to the DR node at an offsite data center of user's choice.
 Encryption: Db2 on Cloud complies with data protection laws and includes at-rest database encryption and SSL connections. The Db2 on Cloud high availability plans offer rolling security updates and all database instances include daily backups. Security patching and maintenance is managed by the database administrator. 
 High availability options: Db2 on Cloud provides a 99.99% uptime service level agreement on the high availability option. Highly available option allows for updates and scaling operations without downtime to applications running on Db2 on Cloud, using Db2's HADR technology.
 Data federation: A single query displays a view of all your data by accessing data distributed across Db2 on-premises and/or Db2 Warehouse on-premises or in the cloud. 
 Private networking: Db2 on Cloud can be deployed on an isolated network that is accessible through a secure Virtual Private Network (VPN).

Db2 Hosted: Formally named "DB2 on Cloud", Db2 Hosted is an unmanaged, hosted version of Db2 on Cloud's transactional, SQL cloud database.

Key features:

 Server control: Db2 Hosted provides custom software for direct server installation. This reduces application latency and integrates with a business's current data management set up. Db2 Hosted offers exact server configuration based on the needs of the business. 
 Encryption: Db2 Hosted supports SSL connections. 
 Elasticity: Db2 Hosted allows for independent scaling of compute and storage to meet changing business needs.

Db2 Warehouse on Cloud
Formerly named "dashDB for Analytics", Db2 Warehouse on Cloud is a fully managed, elastic, cloud data warehouse built for high-performance analytics and machine learning workloads.

Key features include:

 Autonomous cloud service: Db2 Warehouse on Cloud runs on an autonomous platform-as-a-service, and is powered by Db2's autonomous self-tuning engine. Day-to-day operations, including database monitoring, uptime checks and failovers, are fully automated. Operations are supplemented by a DevOps team that are on-call to handle unexpected system failures.
 Optimized for analytics: Db2 Warehouse on Cloud delivers high performance on complex analytics workloads by utilizing IBM BLU Acceleration, a collection of technologies pioneered by IBM Research that features four key optimizations: (1) a columnar organized storage model, (2) in-memory processing, (3) querying of compressed data sets, and (4) data skipping.
 Manage highly concurrent workloads:  Db2 Warehouse on Cloud includes an Adaptive Workload Management technology that automatically manages resources between concurrent workloads, given user-defined resource targets. This technology ensures stable and reliable performance when tackling highly concurrent workloads.
 Built-in machine learning and geospatial capabilities: Db2 Warehouse on Cloud comes with in-database machine learning capabilities that allow users to train and run machine learning models on Db2 Warehouse data without the need for data movement. Examples of algorithms include Association Rules, ANOVA, k-means, Regression, and Naïve Bayes. Db2 Warehouse on Cloud also supports spatial analytics with Esri compatibility, supporting Esri data types such as GML, and supports native Python drivers and native Db2 Python integration into Jupyter Notebooks. 
 Elasticity: Db2 Warehouse on Cloud offers independent scaling of storage and compute, so organizations can customize their data warehouses to meet the needs of their businesses. For example, customers can burst on compute during peak demand, and scale down when demand falls. Users can also expand storage capacity as their data volumes grow. Customers can scale their data warehouse through the Db2 Warehouse on Cloud web console or API. 
 Data security: Data is encrypted at-rest and in-motion by default. Administrators can also restrict access to sensitive data through data masking, row permissions, and role-based security, and can utilize database audit utilities to maintain audit trails for their data warehouse.
 Polyglot persistence: Db2 Warehouse on Cloud is optimized for polyglot persistence of data, and supports relational (columnar and row-oriented tables), geospatial, and NoSQL document (XML, JSON, BSON) models. All data is subject to advanced data compression.
 Deployable on multiple cloud providers: Db2 Warehouse on Cloud is currently deployable on IBM Cloud and Amazon Web Services (AWS). .

Db2 BigSQL
In 2018 the IBM SQL product was renamed and is now known as IBM Db2 Big SQL (Big SQL). Big SQL is an enterprise-grade, hybrid ANSI-compliant SQL on the Hadoop engine delivering massively parallel processing (MPP) and advanced data query. Additional benefits include low latency, high performance, security, SQL compatibility and federation capabilities.

Big SQL offers a single database connection or query for disparate sources such as HDFS, RDMS, NoSQL databases, object stores and WebHDFS. Exploit Hive, Or to exploit Hbase and Spark and whether on the cloud, on premises or both, access data across Hadoop and relational data bases.

Users (data scientists and analysts) can run smarter ad hoc and complex queries supporting more concurrent users with less hardware compared to other SQL options for Hadoop. Big SQL provides an ANSI-compliant SQL parser to run queries from unstructured streaming data using new APIs.

Through the integration with the IBM Common SQL Engine, Big SQL was designed to work with all the Db2 family of offerings, as well as with the IBM Integrated Analytics System. Big SQL is a part of the IBM Hybrid Data Management Platform, a comprehensive IBM strategy for flexibility and portability, strong data integration and flexible licensing.

Db2 Event Store
Db2 Event Store targets the needs of the Internet of things (IOT), industrial, telecommunications, financial services, online retail and other industries needing to perform real-time analytics on streamed high volume, high velocity data. It became publicly available in June 2017. It can store and analyze 250 billion events in a day with just 3 server nodes with its high speed data capture and analytics capabilities.  The need to support AI and machine learning was envisioned from the start by including IBM Watson Studio into the product, and integrating Jupyter notebooks for collaborative app and model development. Typically combined with streaming tools, it provides persistent data by writing the data out to object storage in an open data format (Apache Parquet). Built on Spark, Db2 Event Store is compatible with Spark Machine Learning, Spark SQL, other open technologies, as well as the Db2 family Common SQL Engine and all languages supported – including Python, GO, JDBC, ODBC, and more.

Db2 for IBM i

In 1994, IBM renamed the integrated relational database of the OS/400 to DB2/400 to indicate comparable functionality to DB2 on other platforms. Despite this name, it is not based on DB2 code, but instead it evolved from the IBM System/38 integrated database. The product is currently named IBM Db2 for i.

Other Platforms
 Db2 for Linux, UNIX and Windows (informally known as Db2 LUW)
 Db2 for z/OS (mainframe)
 Db2 for VSE & VM
 Db2 on IBM Cloud
Db2 on Amazon Web Services (AWS)

Db2 for z/OS is available in its traditional product packaging, or in the Value Unit Edition, which allows customers to instead pay a one-time charge.

Db2 also powers IBM InfoSphere Warehouse, which offers data warehouse capabilities. InfoSphere Warehouse is available for z/OS.  It includes several BI features such as ETL, data mining, OLAP acceleration, and in-line analytics.

Db2 11.5 for Linux, UNIX and Windows, contains all of the functionality and tools offered in the prior generation of DB2 and InfoSphere Warehouse on Linux, UNIX and Windows.

Editions
IBM offers three editions: Db2 Community Edition, Standard Server Edition, and Advanced Server Edition.

IBM Db2 Community Edition

IBM Db2 Community Edition is a free to download, use and redistribute edition of the IBM Db2 data server, which has both XML database and relational database management system features. It is limited to four CPU cores, 16 GB of RAM and no Enterprise support and fix packs. Db2 Community Edition has no limit on number of users or database size.

On June 27, 2019, IBM released Db2 V11.5, a Db2 update designed to deliver enhancements to help automate data management, eliminate ETL, and support artificial intelligence data workloads. Along with the update, IBM unveiled streamlined offerings. The free version of Db2 is the Community Edition. This version of Db2 contains all features, does not include an expiration. The caps on this version of Db2 is four CPU cores and 16 GB of RAM. IBM Db2 Community Edition replaces the Db2 Express edition.

IBM Db2 Community edition is limited to use up to 16 GB RAM and four CPU cores. As of version 11.5.7, there was no limit on the database size. Some previous version 11.5 point releases imposed a limit of 100 GB on the database size. The database engine does not limit the number of concurrent user connections. A prior free Db2 version, the IBM DB2 Express-C, supported  up to 16 GB RAM and two CPU cores.

History

On June 27, 2019, IBM announced a special free version of Db2 Database called Db2 Community edition.  The Db2 Community edition was created for the 11.5 release of IBM Db2. The Db2 Community edition replaced the previously free version of IBM Db2 known as DB2 Express-C.

On January 30, 2006, IBM announced a special free version of DB2 Express edition called DB2 Express-C. The DB2 Express-C edition was created for the 8.2 release of IBM Db2. After this Db2 Express-C was created for all new DB2 versions: 9.1 (codenamed "Viper"), 9.5 (codename "Viper 2"), 9.7 (codename "Cobra"), 10.01 (codename "Galileo"), 10.5 (codename "Kepler") and 11.1.

IBM Db2 Standard Edition
The Db2 Standard Edition is available as a perpetual software license for production and non-production use for up to 16 processor cores and 128 GB RAM with IBM support. For production use, Db2 Standard Edition can be licensed based on a Virtual Processor Core metric, wherein it is licensed by the total count of processor cores in a non-partitioned physical server, or virtual cores assigned to a virtual server. For non-production use, Db2 Standard Edition can be licensed based on the total count of authorized users.

IBM Db2 Advanced Edition
The Db2 Advanced Edition is available only as a component of the IBM Hybrid Data Management Platform (HDMP). Within HDMP, Db2 is available both as a perpetual software license AND a monthly subscription for unrestricted production and non-production use with premium IBM support. For both HDMP perpetual license and subscription offerings, you need to buy FlexPoints. Flexpoints are generic licensing credits that can be used to deploy any Db2-family software product or cloud service offering.

Db2 Advanced Edition offers these benefits:
 Improves application performance and analytics for faster decisions.
 Delivers high availability and disaster recovery capabilities.
 Provides a secure, flexible environment
 Interfaces with a variety of data more efficiently.
 Improves productivity and reduces administration efforts.

Code names
IBM has developed many Db2 versions under a code name, and documentation can be related to that name

Db2

 Xperanto
 Stinger - 8.1, 8.2
 Viper - 9.1.
 Viper 2 - 9.5
 Cobra - 9.7
 Galileo - 10.1
 Kepler - 10.5
 Cancun - 10.5.4
 Nebula - 11.5.4
 Andromeda - 12?

Db2 for z/OS

 Eagle
 Sequoia - 11.1

Technical information
Db2 can be administered from either the command-line or a GUI.  The command-line interface requires more knowledge of the product but can be more easily scripted and automated.  The GUI is a multi-platform Java client that contains a variety of wizards suitable for novice users. Db2 supports both SQL and XQuery. DB2 has native implementation of XML data storage, where XML data is stored as XML (not as relational data or CLOB data) for faster access using XQuery.

Db2 has APIs for Rexx, PL/I, COBOL, RPG, Fortran, C++, C, Delphi, .NET CLI, Java, Python, Perl, PHP, Ruby, and many other programming languages. Db2 also supports integration into the Eclipse and Visual Studio integrated development environments.

pureQuery is IBM's data access platform focused on applications that access data. pureQuery supports both Java and .NET. pureQuery provides access to data in databases and in-memory Java objects via its tools, APIs, and runtime environment as delivered in IBM Data Studio Developer and IBM Data Studio pureQuery Runtime.

Error processing
An important feature of Db2 computer programs is error handling. The SQL communications area (SQLCA) structure was once used exclusively within a Db2 program to return error information to the application program after every SQL statement was executed. The primary, but not singularly useful, error diagnostic is held in the field SQLCODE within the SQLCA block.

The SQL return code values are:

 0 means successful execution.
 A positive number means successful execution with one or more warnings. An example is +100, which means no rows found.
 A negative number means unsuccessful with an error. An example is -911, which means a lock timeout (or deadlock) has occurred, triggering a rollback.

Later versions of Db2 added functionality and complexity to the execution of SQL. Multiple errors or warnings could be returned by the execution of an SQL statement; it may, for example, have initiated a database trigger and other SQL statements. Instead of the original SQLCA, error information should now be retrieved by successive executions of a GET DIAGNOSTICS statement.

See SQL return codes for a more comprehensive list of common SQLCODEs.

See also
 Comparison of relational database management systems
 Comparison of database administration tools
 List of relational database management systems
 List of column-oriented DBMSes
 Data Language Interface

References

External links

 
 IBM Db2 trial and downloads
 Db2 - IBM Data for developers
 Made in IBM Labs: New IBM Software Accelerates Decision Making in the Era of Big Data
 What's new in DB2 10.5 for Linux, UNIX, and Windows
 Db2 Tutorial
 DB2 Administration Guide 

IBM DB2
Cross-platform software
Relational database management systems
IBM software
Relational database management software for Linux
Client-server database management systems
Proprietary database management systems
Db2 Express-C